The 2005–06 Ottawa Senators season was the 14th season of the Ottawa Senators of the National Hockey League (NHL). After one of their franchise-best regular seasons, finishing with 113 points, the Senators made it to the Eastern Conference Semifinals, in which the Buffalo Sabres eliminated Ottawa in five games.

Off-season
Changes occurred to the Senators roster before the season. First, Ottawa acquired the playoff-experienced goaltender Dominik Hasek for his Stanley Cup experience. Second, a blockbuster trade on August 23, 2005 involved Marian Hossa and Greg de Vries being sent to the Atlanta Thrashers for Dany Heatley. The trade occurred on the day that Hossa had signed a new contract. The value of Hossa's contract was beyond what General Manager John Muckler felt that Hossa was worth and so he was dealt away. Marian had led the Senators in scoring.

Regular season
Dany Heatley, together with Daniel Alfredsson and Jason Spezza, formed one of the NHL's top offensive lines, dubbed the "CASH line" by fans in a contest held by the Ottawa Citizen. The name is made from the initials of Captain Alfredsson, Spezza, and Heatley. Cash Line won out over finalists 'Dash Line' and 'Dazzle Line,' which Spezza reputedly despised and wanted to veto. Another nickname the line picked up was the "Pizza Line", used by the Ottawa Sun, a rival to the Citizen. However, during the press conference to introduce the teams for the 2007 Stanley Cup Final, Heatley went on record to say he likes the "CASH line" name.

The Senators team sent nine players to the 2006 Winter Olympics as part of the NHL's commitment. Daniel Alfredsson, Zdeno Chara, Martin Havlat, Dany Heatley, Andrej Meszaros, Wade Redden, Christoph Schubert and Anton Volchenkov all played for their respective country's national teams, while Jason Spezza was named a substitute for Canada. The experience, however, was poor for the Senators: Dominik Hasek was having an impressive season prior to Olympic play, but the team lost him to a hamstring injury he suffered while playing for the Czech Republic. He would not play again for the Senators.

In addition to leading the NHL with most goals for (312, excluding shootout-winning goals), the Senators also led the NHL in shorthanded goals (25), scoring points (840) and shots on goal (2,811).

Highlights
The "CASH line" made a dramatic and historic debut, playing in the first game of the 2005–06 season on October 5, 2005, against the Toronto Maple Leafs in Toronto. In the pre-season, right winger Brandon Bochenski had been playing on the line as he had played with Spezza in the American Hockey League (AHL) during the 2004–05 NHL lockout. But with five minutes to go, with the Senators trailing, then Senators' Head Coach Bryan Murray replaced Bochenski with Daniel Alfredsson, who scored a game-tying goal with 62 seconds left. Heatley and Alfredsson would then go on to score the first shootout goals in NHL history to win the game that night. 

Other highlights of the Senators' season included an 8–0 road win over their Ontario rivals, the Maple Leafs, on October 29, 2005. Dany Heatley scored four consecutive goals in that game. Just four nights later, the Senators defeated the Buffalo Sabres in Buffalo, 10–4. Martin Havlat and Daniel Alfredsson each scored four goals and Jason Spezza provided four assists. It was the first time that an NHL team had scored ten goals in a regular-season game since January 11, 2003, when the Washington Capitals defeated the Florida Panthers at home by a score of 12–2. It was also the first time that the Senators had scored ten goals in a regular-season game since November 13, 2001, when they defeated the Capitals 11–5 away in Washington, D.C. On November 29, 2005, the Senators defeated the Montreal Canadiens 4–0 and, in doing so, improved to a 19–3–0 record through their first 22 games of the regular season. Over that span, Ottawa outscored its opponents 102–45. Spezza had reached 41 points (11 goals and 30 assists) and Alfredsson had reached 40 points (20 goals and 20 assists) by this point. Heatley recorded a point in every one of these games and had 17 goals and 21 assists for 38 points.

In an 8–2 win over Toronto on December 17, 2005, the Senators set a franchise record for most power play goals scored in one game, with six. On February 2, 2006, the Senators scored three short-handed goals in a 7–2 win over the Pittsburgh Penguins. It was the second time in franchise history that the Senators scored three shorthanded goals in a single game, as the Senators had scored three shorthanded goals in a 5–2 home win over the Florida Panthers on November 18, 2000.

Dany Heatley became the first Senator in franchise history to reach 100 points on April 13, 2006, recording two assists during a 5–4 overtime loss to the Florida Panthers and five days later became the first Senator to score 50 goals in a season. Meanwhile, defenceman Wade Redden became the first Senator to win the NHL Plus/Minus Award, tied with New York Ranger Michal Rozsival, with a +35 rating. Despite missing 14 games, Jason Spezza finished second in the NHL in assists, with 71.

Season standings

Playoffs
The Ottawa Senators ended the 2005–06 regular season as the Eastern Conference's first seed, qualifying for the playoffs for the ninth time in the franchise's 13 seasons of play.

Ray Emery took over the starting goaltender duties; he became the first rookie netminder since Philadelphia's Brian Boucher in 2000 to win a playoff series when the Senators defeated the Tampa Bay Lightning in the first round of the Eastern Conference playoffs, four games to one.  The Senators were then defeated by the Buffalo Sabres in the second round, four games to one.

After the playoff loss, Senators owner Eugene Melnyk comforted fans in an open letter by saying that their team would not only win the Stanley Cup in the future but, once they had it, they would, he boasted, "hoard" it year after year.

Schedule and results

Regular season

|- align="center" bgcolor="#bbffbb"
| 1 || October 5  || Ottawa || 3–2 || Toronto Maple Leafs || SO || Hasek || 19,452 || 1–0–0 || 2 || 
|- align="center" bgcolor="#bbffbb"
| 2 || October 8  || Buffalo Sabres || 0–5 || Ottawa || || Hasek || 19,661 || 2–0–0 || 4 || 
|- align="center" bgcolor="#bbffbb"
| 3 || October 10 || Toronto Maple Leafs || 5–6 || Ottawa || SO || Hasek || 18,680 || 3–0–0 || 6 || 
|- align="center" bgcolor="#bbffbb"
| 4 || October 11 || Ottawa || 4–2 || Montreal Canadiens || || Emery || 21,273 || 4–0–0 || 8 || 
|- align="center" bgcolor="#bbffbb"
| 5 || October 15 || Boston Bruins || 1–5 || Ottawa || || Hasek || 19,379 || 5–0–0 || 10 || 
|- align="center" bgcolor="#bbffbb"
| 6 || October 21 || Ottawa || 4–1 || Tampa Bay Lightning || || Hasek || 20,494 || 6–0–0 || 12 || 
|- align="center" bgcolor="#ffbbbb"
| 7 || October 24 || Ottawa || 2–3 || Carolina Hurricanes || || Hasek || 12,116 || 6–1–0 || 12 || 
|- align="center" bgcolor="#bbffbb"
| 8 || October 27 || Montreal Canadiens || 3–4 || Ottawa || OT || Emery || 18,840 || 7–1–0 || 14 || 
|- align="center" bgcolor="#bbffbb"
| 9 || October 29 || Ottawa || 8–0 || Toronto Maple Leafs || || Hasek || 19,480 || 8–1–0 || 16 || 
|- align="center" bgcolor="#ffbbbb"
| 10 ||October 30 || Philadelphia Flyers || 5–3 || Ottawa || || Hasek || 19,335 || 8–2–0 || 16 || 
|-

|- align="center" bgcolor="#bbffbb"
| 11 || November 2  || Ottawa || 10–4 || Buffalo Sabres ||  || Emery || 13,905 || 9–2–0 || 18 || 
|- align="center" bgcolor="#bbffbb"
| 12 || November 3  || Tampa Bay Lightning || 4–2 || Ottawa || || Hasek || 18,604 || 10–2–0 || 20 || 
|- align="center" bgcolor="#bbffbb"
| 13 || November 5  || New York Islanders || 0-6 || Ottawa || || Hasek || 19,776 || 11–2–0 || 22 || 
|- align="center" bgcolor="#bbffbb"
| 14 || November 10 || Ottawa || 5–2 || Boston Bruins || || Hasek || 17,159 || 12–2–0 || 24 || 
|- align="center" bgcolor="#bbffbb"
| 15 || November 12 || Buffalo Sabres || 1–6 || Ottawa || || Emery || 19,414 || 13–2–0|| 26 || 
|- align="center" bgcolor="#ffbbbb"
| 16 || November 15 || Carolina Hurricanes || 2–1 || Ottawa || || Hasek || 19,544 || 13–3–0 || 26 || 
|- align="center" bgcolor="#bbffbb"
| 17 || November 17 || Florida Panthers || 1–4 || Ottawa || || Hasek || 18,650 || 14–3–0 || 28 || 
|- align="center" bgcolor="#bbffbb"
| 18 || November 19 || New Jersey Devils || 4–5 || Ottawa || || Emery || 19,534 || 15–3–0 || 30 || 
|- align="center" bgcolor="#bbffbb"
| 19 || November 22 || Ottawa || 5–3 || Carolina Hurricanes || || Hasek || 13,427 || 16–3–0|| 32 || 
|- align="center" bgcolor="#bbffbb"
| 20 || November 25 || Ottawa || 6–2 || New York Islanders || || Hasek || 15,564 || 17–3–0 || 35 || 
|- align="center" bgcolor="#bbffbb"
| 21 || November 26 || Boston Bruins|| 2–4 || Ottawa || || Hasek || 19,691 || 18–3–0 || 36 || 
|- align="center" bgcolor="#bbffbb"
| 22 || November 29 || Montreal Canadiens || 0–4 || Ottawa || || Emery || 19,858 || 19–3–0 || 38 || 
|-

|- align="center" bgcolor="#ffbbbb"
| 23 || December 1  || Ottawa || 0–3 || Boston Bruins || || Hasek || 15,639 || 19–4–0 || 38 || 
|- align="center" bgcolor="#bbffbb"
| 24 || December 2  || Los Angeles Kings || 1–5 || Ottawa || || Hasek || 19,671 || 20–4–0 || 40 || 
|- align="center" bgcolor="#bbffbb"
| 25 || December 5  || Ottawa || 6–3 || Florida Panthers || || Hasek || 10,883 || 21–4–0 || 42 || 
|- align="center"
| 26 || December 9  || Ottawa || 2–3 || Vancouver Canucks || SO || Hasek || 18,630 || 21–4–1 || 44 || 
|- align="center"
| 27 || December 10 || Ottawa || 1–2 || Calgary Flames || OT || Emery || 19,289 || 21–4–2 || 44 || 
|- align="center" bgcolor="#bbffbb"
| 28 || December 12 || Ottawa || 6–2 || Colorado Avalanche || || Hasek || 18,007 || 22–4–2 || 46 || 
|- align="center" bgcolor="#ffbbbb"
| 29 || December 15 || Dallas Stars || 2–0 || Ottawa || || Emery || 19,598 || 22–5–2 || 46 || 
|- align="center" bgcolor="#bbffbb"
| 30 || December 17 || Toronto Maple Leafs || 2–8 || Ottawa || || Hasek || 19,935|| 23–5–2 || 48 || 
|- align="center"
| 31 || December 20 || Ottawa || 3–4 || Montreal Canadiens || SO || Hasek || 21,273 || 23–5–3 || 49 || 
|- align="center" bgcolor="#ffbbbb"
| 32 || December 22 || Ottawa || 3–4 || Philadelphia Flyers || || Hasek || 19,817 || 23–6–3|| 49 || 
|- align="center" bgcolor="#bbffbb"
| 33 || December 23 || Ottawa || 4–2 || New York Islanders || || Emery || 11,425|| 24–6–3 || 51 || 
|- align="center" bgcolor="#bbffbb"
| 34 || December 26 || New York Rangers || 2–6 || Ottawa || || Hasek|| 19,806 || 25–6–3 || 53 || 
|- align="center" bgcolor="#bbffbb"
| 35 || December 28 || Carolina Hurricanes || 2–6 || Ottawa || || Hasek || 20,050 || 26–6–3 || 55 || 
|- align="center" bgcolor="#bbffbb"
| 36 || December 30 || New York Islanders || 3–4 || Ottawa || || Emery || 20,055 || 27–6–3 || 57 || 
|-

|- align="center" bgcolor="#ffbbbb"
| 37 || January 2  || Ottawa || 3–8 || Atlanta Thrashers || || Emery || 12,536 || 27–7–3 || 57 || 
|- align="center" bgcolor="#bbffbb"
| 38 || January 4  || Ottawa || 3–1 || Washington Capitals || || Hasek || 10,047 || 28–7–3 || 59 || 
|- align="center" bgcolor="#ffbbbb"
| 39 || January 5  || Ottawa || 2–4 || Boston Bruins|| || Hasek || 15,481 || 28–8–3 || 59 || 
|- align="center" bgcolor="#ffbbbb"
| 40 || January 7  || Ottawa || 1–4 || Montreal Canadiens || || Hasek || 21,273 || 28–9–3 || 59 || 
|- align="center" bgcolor="#bbffbb"
| 41 || January 10 || Phoenix Coyotes || 2–7 || Ottawa || || Hasek || 19,773 || 29–9–3 || 61 || 
|- align="center" bgcolor="#ffbbbb"
| 42 || January 12 || San Jose Sharks || 2–0 || Ottawa || || Hasek || 19,538 || 29–10–3 || 61 || 
|- align="center" bgcolor="#bbffbb"
| 43 || January 14 || Ottawa || 5–3 || Edmonton Oilers || || Hasek || 16,839 || 30–10–3 || 63 || 
|- align="center" bgcolor="#bbffbb"
| 44 || January 16 || Ottawa || 6–1 || Minnesota Wild || || Hasek || 18,568 || 31–10–3|| 65 || 
|- align="center"
| 45 || January 19 || Anaheim Ducks || 4–3 || Ottawa || SO || Hasek || 19,387 || 31–10–4 || 66 || 
|- align="center" bgcolor="#bbffbb"
| 46 || January 21 || Toronto Maple Leafs || 0–7 || Ottawa || || Hasek || 20,093 || 32–10–4 || 68 || 
|- align="center" bgcolor="#bbffbb"
| 47 || January 23 || Toronto Maple Leafs || 3–4 || Ottawa || || Hasek || 19,865 || 33–10–4 || 70 || 
|- align="center" bgcolor="#bbffbb"
| 48 || January 26 || Montreal Canadiens || 0–3 || Ottawa || || Hasek || 19,908 || 34–10–4 || 72 || 
|- align="center" bgcolor="#ffbbbb"
| 49 || January 30 || Boston Bruins || 5–0 || Ottawa || || Emery || 19,551 || 34–11–4 || 72
|| 
|-

|- align="center" bgcolor="#ffbbbb"
| 50 || February 1  || Ottawa || 3–5 || New Jersey Devils || || Hasek || 10,142 || 34–12–4 || 72 || 
|- align="center" bgcolor="#bbffbb"
| 51 || February 2  || Ottawa || 7–2 || Pittsburgh Penguins || || Hasek || 14,714 || 35–12–4 || 74 || 
|- align="center"
| 52 || February 4  || Ottawa || 1–2 || Buffalo Sabres || SO || Hasek || 17,451 || 35–12–5 || 75 || 
|- align="center"  bgcolor="#bbffbb"
| 53 || February 6  || Pittsburgh Penguins || 2–5 || Ottawa || || Emery || 19,877 || 36–12–5 || 77 || 
|- align="center" bgcolor="#ffbbbb"
| 54 || February 8  || Ottawa || 1–5 || New York Rangers || || Hasek || 18,200 || 36–13–5 || 77 || 
|- align="center" bgcolor="#ffbbbb"
| 55 || February 9  || Atlanta Thrashers || 2–1 || Ottawa || || Hasek || 19,604 || 36–14–5 || 77 || 
|- align="center" bgcolor="#bbffbb"
| 56 || February 11 || Philadelphia Flyers || 2–3 || Ottawa || || Hasek || 19,834 || 37–14–5 || 79 || 
|-

|- align="center" bgcolor="#bbffbb"
| 57 || March 1  || Ottawa || 4–3 || Pittsburgh Penguins || || Emery || 14,026 || 38–14–5 || 81 || 
|- align="center" bgcolor="#bbffbb"
| 58 || March 2  || Washington Capitals || 1–7 || Ottawa || || Emery || 19,346 || 39–14–5 || 83 || 
|- align="center" bgcolor="#bbffbb"
| 59 || March 4  || Ottawa || 4–2 || Toronto Maple Leafs || || Emery || 19,486 || 40–14–5 || 85 || 
|- align="center" bgcolor="#bbffbb"
| 60 || March 6  || Ottawa || 4–0 || Tampa Bay Lightning || || Emery || 19,855 || 41–14–5 || 87 || 
|- align="center" bgcolor="#ffbbbb"
| 61 || March 8  || Ottawa || 2–6 || Florida Panthers || || Emery || 15,196 || 41–15–5 || 87 || 
|- align="center" bgcolor="#bbffbb"
| 62 || March 10 || Ottawa || 3–1 || Atlanta Thrashers || || Emery || 15,057 || 42–15–5 || 89 || 
|- align="center" bgcolor="#bbffbb"
| 63 || March 12 || Ottawa || 5–2 || Washington Capitals || || Emery || 15,740 || 43–15–5 || 91 || 
|- align="center" bgcolor="#bbffbb"
| 64 || March 14 || Tampa Bay Lightning || 3–4 || Ottawa || || Emery || 19,810 || 44–15–5 || 93 || 
|- align="center"
| 65 || March 16 || Ottawa || 2–3 || Boston Bruins || SO || Emery || 15,066 || 44–15–6 || 94 || 
|- align="center" bgcolor="#bbffbb"
| 66 || March 18 || Buffalo Sabres || 2–4 || Ottawa || || Emery || 19,947 || 45–15–6 || 96 || 
|- align="center" bgcolor="#bbffbb"
| 67 || March 19 || Ottawa || 4–0 || New Jersey Devils || || Emery || 14,681 || 46–15–6 || 98 || 
|- align="center" bgcolor="#bbffbb"
| 68 || March 21 || Pittsburgh Penguins || 2–5 || Ottawa || || Emery || 19,360 || 47–15–6 || 100 || 
|- align="center" bgcolor="#bbffbb"
| 69 || March 24 || Ottawa || 3–1 || Buffalo Sabres || || Emery || 18,690 || 48–15–6 || 102 || 
|- align="center" bgcolor="#ffbbbb"
| 70 || March 25 || Ottawa || 3–6 || Philadelphia Flyers || || Emery || 19,869 || 48–16–6 || 103 || 
|- align="center"
| 71 || March 28 || New Jersey Devils || 3–2 || Ottawa || SO || Emery || 18,668 || 48–16–7 || 103 || 
|- align="center" bgcolor="#bbffbb"
| 72 || March 30 || New York Rangers || 1–4 || Ottawa || || Emery || 18,710 || 49–16–7 || 105
|| 
|-

|- align="center" bgcolor="#ffbbbb"
| 73 || April 1  || Washington Capitals || 1–0 || Ottawa || || Emery || 19,403 || 49–17–7 || 105 || 
|- align="center" bgcolor="#bbffbb"
| 74 || April 3  || Atlanta Thrashers || 4–6 || Ottawa || || Emery || 18,742 || 50–17–7 || 107 || 
|- align="center"
| 75 || April 5  || Ottawa || 4–5 || Buffalo Sabres || OT || Emery || 17,622 || 50–17–8 || 108 || 
|- align="center" bgcolor="#ffbbbb"
| 76 || April 6  || Montreal Canadiens || 5–3 || Ottawa || || Emery || 19,929 || 50–18–8 || 108 || 
|- align="center" bgcolor="#ffbbbb"
| 77 || April 8  || Buffalo Sabres || 6–2 || Ottawa || || Emery || 19,575 || 50–19–8 || 108 || 
|- align="center" bgcolor="#ffbbbb"
| 78 || April 10 || Ottawa || 2–3 || Montreal Canadiens || || Emery || 21,273 || 50–20–8 || 108 || 
|- align="center" bgcolor="#bbffbb"
| 79 || April 11 || Boston Bruins || 3–4 || Ottawa || OT || Morrison || 18,279 || 51–20–8 || 110 || 
|- align="center"
| 80 || April 13 || Florida Panthers || 5–4 || Ottawa || OT || Morrison || 19,173 || 51–20–9|| 111 || 
|- align="center" bgcolor="#ffbbbb"
| 81 || April 15 || Ottawa || 1–5 || Toronto Maple Leafs || || Emery || 19,410 || 51–21–9 || 111 || 
|- align="center" bgcolor="#bbffbb"
| 82 || April 18 || Ottawa || 5–1 || New York Rangers || || Emery || 18,200 || 52–21–9|| 113 || 
|-

|-
| Legend:

Playoffs

|- align="center" bgcolor="#bbffbb"
| 1 || April 21 || Tampa Bay || 1–4 || Ottawa || || Emery || 19,660 || Senators lead 1–0 || 
|- align="center" bgcolor="#ffbbbb"
| 2 || April 23 || Tampa Bay || 4–3 || Ottawa || || Emery || 19,745 || Series tied 1–1 || 
|- align="center" bgcolor="#bbffbb"  
| 3 || April 25 || Ottawa || 8–4 || Tampa Bay || || Emery || 20,815 || Senators lead 2–1 || 
|- align="center" bgcolor="#bbffbb"
| 4 || April 27 || Ottawa || 5–2 || Tampa Bay || || Emery || 20,682 || Senators lead 3–1 || 
|- align="center" bgcolor="#bbffbb"
| 5 || April 29 || Tampa Bay || 2–3 || Ottawa || || Emery || 20,004 || Senators win 4–1 || 
|-

|- align="center" bgcolor="#ffbbbb"
| 1 || May 5 || Buffalo || 7–6 || Ottawa || OT || Emery || 19,544 || Sabres lead 1–0 || 
|- align="center" bgcolor="#ffbbbb"
| 2 || May 8 || Buffalo || 2–1 || Ottawa || || Emery || 19,816 || Sabres lead 2–0 || 
|- align="center" bgcolor="#ffbbbb"
| 3 || May 10 || Ottawa || 2–3 || Buffalo || OT || Emery || 18,690 || Sabres lead 3–0 || 
|- align="center" bgcolor="#bbffbb"
| 4 || May 11 || Ottawa || 2–1 || Buffalo || || Emery || 18,690 || Sabres lead 3–1 || 
|- align="center" bgcolor="#ffbbbb"
| 5 || May 13 || Buffalo || 3–2 || Ottawa || OT || Emery || 20,024 || Sabres win 4–1 || 
|-

|-
| Legend:

Player statistics

Scoring
 Position abbreviations: C = Centre; D = Defence; G = Goaltender; LW = Left Wing; RW = Right Wing
  = Joined team via a transaction (e.g., trade, waivers, signing) during the season. Stats reflect time with the Senators only.
  = Left team via a transaction (e.g., trade, waivers, release) during the season. Stats reflect time with the Senators only.

Goaltending
  = Joined team via a transaction (e.g., trade, waivers, signing) during the season. Stats reflect time with the Senators only.

Awards and records

Awards

Transactions
The Senators were involved in the following transactions from February 17, 2005, the day after the 2004–05 NHL season was officially cancelled, through June 19, 2006, the day of the deciding game of the 2006 Stanley Cup Finals.

Trades

Players acquired

Players lost

Signings

Draft picks
Ottawa's picks at the 2005 NHL Entry Draft in Ottawa, Ontario.

Farm teams
 Binghamton Senators (American Hockey League)
 Charlotte Checkers (ECHL)

See also
 2005–06 NHL season

Notes

References

Ottawa Senators seasons
Ottawa Senators season
Ottawa